In the medieval history of Kievan Rus' and Early Poland, a druzhina, drużyna, or družyna (Slovak and ; ; ; , druzhýna literally a "fellowship") was a retinue in service of a Slavic chieftain, also called knyaz. The name is derived from the Slavic word drug (друг) with the meaning of "companion, friend".

Early Rus'

In Early Rus', a druzhina helped the prince administer his principality and constituted the area's military force. The first members of a druzhina were the Varangians, whose princes established control there in the 9th century. Soon, members of the local Slavic aristocracy and adventurers of a variety of other nationalities became druzhinniki. The druzhina's organization varied with time and survived in one form or another until the 16th century.

The druzhina was composed of two groups: the senior members, later known as boyars, and the junior members, later known as boyar scions. The boyars were the prince's closest advisers and performed higher state functions. The junior members constituted the prince's personal bodyguard and were common soldiers. Members were dependent upon their prince for financial support but served the prince freely and had the right to leave him and join the druzhina of another prince.

As a result, a prince was inclined to seek the goodwill of his druzhina by paying the druzhinniki wages, sharing his war booty and taxes with them and eventually rewarding the boyars with landed estates that were complete with rights to tax and administer justice to the local population.

At the Battle of Lake Peipus, the army of the Novgorod Republic had about 5000 men in all. Around 3000 men in both the cavalry and the infantry were part of Alexander Nevsky's druzhina.

Poland 

Ibrahim ibn Yaqub, who traveled in 961–62 in Central Europe, mentions that the drużyna of Duke Mieszko I of Poland had 3000 men, paid by the duke.

Unlike his predecessors, Casimir I the Restorer promoted landed gentry over the drużyna as his base of power.

See also
Housecarl
Leidang
Hird
Voluntary People's Druzhina, a civilian organization in the Soviet Union
Czechoslovak Legion First unit in Russia, called the "Czech Companions" (Česká družina or Družina)
Wenceslaus I, Duke of Bohemia murdered by Boleslav's companion

References

External links

Society of Kievan Rus'
Protective service occupations
Early Germanic warfare
History of Poland during the Piast dynasty
Court titles